Adrienne Salinger (born 1956) is an American photographer.

Salinger is best known for her 1995 photo book In My Room: Teenagers in their Bedrooms. Her work is included in the collection of the Museum of Fine Arts Houston, the Washington State Arts Commission, the National Gallery of Canada and the Art Institute of Chicago. Salinger is a professor of photography at the University of New Mexico.

Photo books
1995 In My Room: Teenagers in their Bedrooms
1999 Living Solo
2007 Middle Aged Men

References

Living people
1956 births
20th-century American photographers
21st-century American photographers
20th-century American women artists
21st-century American women artists